Vanitas with the Spinario is a 1628 still life painting by Pieter Claesz, now in the Rijksmuseum in Amsterdam. It belongs to the sub-genre of vanitas. To the left is a reduced-size reproduction of the Spinario statue.

Sources
 Rynck, Patrick de: Pieter Claesz, «Naturaleza muerta vanitas con el "Spinario"», en las pp. 266-267 de Cómo leer la pintura, 2005, Grupo Editorial Random House Mondadori, S.L., 

1628 paintings
Still life paintings
Paintings in the collection of the Rijksmuseum
Musical instruments in art
Skulls in art
Books in art